Myron karnsi, also known as the Aru mangrove snake or Karns' mangrove snake, is a species of venomous homalopsid snake native to the Aru Islands of Indonesia. The specific epithet karnsi honours herpetologist Daryl Karns of the Field Museum of Natural History.

Description
This is a melanistic species.

Distribution and habitat
The species is known only from the Aru Islands of the Arafura Sea, lying between southern New Guinea and northern Australia.

References

karnsi
Reptiles of Indonesia
Fauna of the Aru Islands
Reptiles described in 2011